The Mayes-Hutton House is a historic house in Columbia, Maury County, Tennessee, USA.

History
The house was built in 1854 for Samuel Mayes, who sold his slaves as he believed slavery would come to an end, and re-invested his money in this house.

Architecture
The original portion of the house has a large 54 foot by 58 foot section with an 18 by 18 foot attached wing on the west of the back side.  The brown brick house sits on a stucco-covered limestone foundation.  The front of the house, probably heavily modified in the 1870s, includes four fluted Corinthian columns supporting a pediment, and a parapet, presenting a massive front facade.  The interior is less ostentatious. but well designed, with a central hall that continues through the house, a free-standing stair, and balcony.

Heritage significance
It was added to the National Register of Historic Places for its architectural qualities on July 8, 1970.

References

Houses on the National Register of Historic Places in Tennessee
Houses in Columbia, Tennessee
Houses completed in 1854
National Register of Historic Places in Maury County, Tennessee